The Australian National Time Trial Championships, are held annually with an event for each category of rider: Men, Women & under 23 riders. The event has been run concurrently with the Australian National Road Race Championships since 2002. The Australian Championships have officially been known as the Scody Australian Open Road Cycling Championships since 1999, taking the name of their main sponsor, but are more commonly referred to as The Nationals. According to Cycling Australia, the under 23 men's time trial championships were introduced in 2001. Gran fondo national championships were introduced in 2016. E-sports made a debut in 2019.

The winners of each event are awarded with a symbolic cycling jersey featuring green and yellow stripes, which can be worn by the rider at other time trialling events in the country to show their status as national champion. The champion's stripes can be combined into a sponsored rider's team kit design for this purpose.

Multiple winners

Men

Women

Elite

Men

Women

Under 23

Men

Women

Junior / Under 19

Men

Women

See also
Australian National Road Race Championships
Australian National Criterium Championships
National Road Cycling Championships

References

Cycle racing in Australia
National road cycling championships
Cycling